Malacothamnus aboriginum is an uncommon species of flowering plant in the mallow family known by the common names gray bushmallow and Indian Valley bushmallow.

Description
Malacothamnus aboriginum is a bushy shrub with thick branches coated in hairs. It reaches heights between 2 and 3 meters. It bears oval or rounded leaves several centimeters long which are generally divided into sharp lobes. The inflorescence is a cluster of many pale pink flowers with oval or rounded petals one half to one centimeter long.

Distribution
Malacothamnus aboriginum is endemic to California, where it is native to the Inner Central Coast Ranges to the west of the San Joaquin Valley-Central Valley. Its habitat includes the chaparral and woodland of the rocky hillsides, where it is most plentiful after wildfire.

References

External links
Jepson Manual Treatment: Malacothamnus aboriginum
USDA Plants Profile: Malacothamnus aboriginum
Malacothamnus aboriginum Photo gallery

aboriginum
Endemic flora of California
Flora without expected TNC conservation status